The Big Shot is a 1937 American comedy film directed by Edward Killy from a screenplay by Arthur T. Horman and Bert Granet, based on a story by Lawrence Pohle and Thomas Ahearn. The film stars Guy Kibbee, Cora Witherspoon, Dorothy Moore, and Russell Hicks. Produced and distributed by RKO Radio Pictures, the film premiered on July 23, 1937.

Plot
Bertram Simms is a veterinarian in a small town, who is quite content with his place in life. When he inherits a large estate and fortune from an unknown relative, he wants to continue living in the small town. His wife, Elizabeth, has other plans, wanting to see their daughter, Peggy, enter into high society in the city where Bertram's relative (an uncle) used to live. Upon their arrival in the uncle's mansion things do not seem to add up properly.

Unbeknownst to the Simms, Bertram's uncle was the leader of a criminal gang. When Bertram is persuaded by Peggy's boyfriend, Chet, to purchase the newspaper that Chet works for which had been closed down by the gang, he restarts the paper's crusade to rid the city of its criminal element. When Elizabeth is conned into throwing a massive gala by the leader of the gang, Martin Blake, she believes the party will be the host to the crème de la crème of the city's society. During the party, Bertram is mistakenly identified as the leader of the city's criminal underworld. In spite of the misidentification, Bertram is cleared of any wrongdoing, and Blake and his men are apprehended by the police.

Cast
 Guy Kibbee as Dr. Bertram Simms
 Cora Witherspoon as Elizabeth Simms
 Dorothy Moore as Peggy Simms
 Gordon Jones as Chester "Chet" Scott
 Russell Hicks as Martin Blake
 Frank M. Thomas as Murdock
 Dudley Clements as Honest John McQuade
 George Irving as Police Chief
 Maxine Jennings as Gloria
 Barbara Pepper as Mamie
 Tom Kennedy as Bugs
 John Kelly as Deuces
 Eddie Gribbon as Soapy
 Al Hill as Spots
 Donald Kirke as Johnny Cullen

(Cast list as per AFI database)

Production
During production the title of the film was Take the Heir.

Reception
The Film Daily gave the film a positive review, stating that the "High content of laughs and able performances mark pleasing comedy". They went on to say that Killy's direction maximized the performances, while applauding the camera work of Nicholas Musuraca. Harrison's Reports was less flattering, calling it "mildly amusing", and commenting that it was slow-moving and that the plot was less than believable. They did compliment Kibbee on his performance. Modern Screen also felt it was "mildly diverting", and while they thought the concept was amusing, they were less than pleased with the screenplay, and felt that Cora Witherspoon's performance was poor. Motion Picture Daily was slightly more positive, also calling the film amusing, but felt the plot had several interesting twists, and praised Edward Killey's direction.

References

External links
 
 
 
 

1937 films
American comedy films
1937 comedy films
American black-and-white films
Films directed by Edward Killy
1930s English-language films
1930s American films